David Truell was a member of the Wisconsin State Assembly.

Biography
Truell was born on August 9, 1814, in Grafton, New Hampshire. He died on February 8, 1889.

Career
Truell was a member of the Assembly during the 1877 session. Additionally, he was Supervisor of Lyndon, Juneau County, Wisconsin, Register of Deeds of Juneau County, Wisconsin and a justice of the peace. He was a Republican.

References

External links

People from Grafton, New Hampshire
People from Juneau County, Wisconsin
Wisconsin city council members
Republican Party members of the Wisconsin State Assembly
American justices of the peace
1814 births
1889 deaths
Burials in Wisconsin
19th-century American politicians
19th-century American judges